AD Leonis (Gliese 388) is a red dwarf star. It is located relatively near the Sun, at a distance of about 16 light years, in the constellation Leo. AD Leonis is a main sequence star with a spectral classification of M3.5V. It is a flare star that undergoes random increases in luminosity.

Properties
AD Leonis is an M-type star with a spectral type M3.5eV, indicating it is a main sequence star that displays emission lines in its spectrum. It has about 39–42% of the Sun's mass — above the mass at which a star is fully convective — and 39% of the Sun's radius. The projected rotation of this star is only 3 km/s, but it completes a rotation once every 2.24 days. It is a relatively young star with an estimated age of 25–300 million years, and is considered a member of the young disk population.

The variable nature of this star was first observed in 1949 by Katherine C. Gordon and Gerald E. Kron at Lick Observatory. AD Leonis is one of the most active flare stars known, and the emissions from the flares have been detected across the electromagnetic spectrum as high as the X-ray band. The net magnetic flux at the surface is about 3 kG. Besides star spots, about 73% of the surface is covered by magnetically active regions. Examination of the corona in X-ray shows compact loop structures that span up to 30% of the size of the star. The average temperature of the corona is around 6.39 MK.

During a 1943 proper motion study by Dirk Reuyl at McCormick Observatory, it was suspected of having a companion. However, a 1968 study by Sarah L. Lippincott at Sproul Observatory was unable to confirm this result.
A 1997 search with a near-infrared speckle interferometer failed to detect a companion orbiting 1–10 AU from the star. In 2001, an optical coronagraph was used to example the star, but no companion was found. There is no sign of variability in its radial velocity, which would otherwise indicate the presence of an unseen companion.

This star is orbiting through the Milky Way galaxy with an eccentricity of 0.028 . This carries the star as close as 8.442 kpc from the galactic core, and as far as 8.926 kpc. The orbital inclination carries it as far as 0.121 kpc from the plane of the galaxy.

In 2021, a superflare on AD Leo was observed simultaneously in X-ray by XMM-Newton and in optical by TESS.

Search for planets
In 2019, one candidate planet signal was detected by the radial velocity method but was refuted in 2020.

See also
 List of nearest stars

References

External links
 

Leo (constellation)
Local Bubble
M-type main-sequence stars
0388
Leonis, AD
BD+20 2465